Lori Lansens is a Canadian novelist and screenwriter.

Profile
Lansens, a successful screenwriter, has credits including the films South of Wawa, Wolf Girl and Marine Life, prior to publishing her first novel Rush Home Road in 2002. It was a shortlisted finalist for the Rogers Writers' Trust Fiction Prize.

Lansens' follow-up novel, The Girls, was published in 2005. The Girls received recognition as a 2007 Best Book for Young Adults from the American Library Association. and was longlisted for the Orange Prize in 2007.

She followed up with The Wife's Tale in 2009, and The Mountain Story in 2015. In fall 2019 Lansens published This Little Light, concerning the bombing of a Calabasas Christian school, after which a rebellious young girl is accused of the crime. The novel deals with themes of sex and religion, both common themes for this author.

Originally from Chatham, Ontario, Lansens currently resides in Los Angeles with her husband, television director and producer Milan Cheylov, along with their children.

Bibliography 
 Rush Home Road (2002) 
 The Girls (2006) 
 The Wife's Tale (2010) 
 The Mountain Story (2015) 
 This Little Light (2019)

References

External links 
 
 

1962 births
21st-century Canadian novelists
Canadian women screenwriters
Canadian women novelists
Living people
People from Chatham-Kent
21st-century Canadian women writers
21st-century Canadian screenwriters